Ryan James Bittle (born March 21, 1976) is an American actor. He began appearing on television in 1994.

Early life
Bittle was born in La Crescenta, California, the son of Kathy Homewood, a nurse, and ICU director, and Jim Bittle, a Glendale fire captain. He has a younger brother, Ron, and an older brother, Jeff. Bittle attended Crescenta Valley High School (where he was an All-American water polo player), Pasadena City College, The London Academy of Music and Dramatic Art and The Juilliard School, Drama division (group 31), in New York City.

Career
Bittle originally had plans to play NCAA water polo and then to attend medical school before he discovered acting in his senior year of high school. This led him to postpone college in order to play a role in the television series Sweet Valley High.  He played the role of Todd Wilkins in the first two seasons of the series (1994-1996). 

While studying at Pasadena City College, Bittle continued to work as an actor with guest starring roles in 1996 on the television series Buffy the Vampire Slayer, Boy Meets World and The Parent 'Hood. He also had a recurring role on 7th Heaven as Jessica Biel's early love interest and supporting roles in the films Tear it Down, Devil in the Flesh and The Clown at Midnight. While working on the latter with Christopher Plummer in 1998, Bittle decided he wanted to leave Hollywood for New York to spend some more time studying at The Juilliard School. In New York, Bittle was in numerous productions with the actors Nathan Baesel, Jennifer Carpenter, Daniel Breaker and James Martinez.

Back in Los Angeles, Bittle continued with a recurring role on the successful WB drama Dawson's Creek and the PBS drama American Family. He also had varying guest star roles on shows such as the CBS dramas CSI: Miami, CSI: NY, Numb3rs and NCIS. He also played an actor for the second time in his career on Courteney Cox's TV show Dirt.

In 2003, Bittle starred as Christian opposite Mark Harelik and Gregory Itzin in Cyrano de Bergerac at South Coast Repertory.

Bittle was in three films released in 2010-2011: Take Me Home Tonight, a 1980s set comedy starring with Topher Grace and Anna Faris; Backyard Wedding, starring with Alicia Witt and Frances Fisher and the horror/thriller A Lure: Teen Fight Club.

In 2012, Bittle starred in Annie Claus Is Coming To Town, opposite Maria Thayer and Sam Page, as well as the made-for-TV movie Operation Cupcake, opposite Dean Cain and Kristy Swanson. He also guest starred on The Closer and the NBC comedy The New Normal.

In 2013, Bittle guest starred on the Showtime series Shameless as well as reviving the role of JR Chandler on the revived Prospect Park's All My Children.

In 2014, Bittle starred in two films, Love By the Book, starring opposite Leah Renee, and A Christmas Mystery opposite Esmé Bianco.

Personal life
Bittle enjoys playing sports.  He plays golf and tennis when he can. In his spare time he plays masters water polo and coaches polo at high school and club level.

Bittle also enjoys flying and received his private pilot's license in 2001.

In 2003, Bittle married Jennifer Davis; they divorced in 2006.

Filmography

Film

Television

References

External links 

1976 births
Living people
People from La Crescenta-Montrose, California
American male film actors
American male water polo players
Aviators from California
American male television actors
Pasadena City College alumni